Copelatus binaghii is a species of diving beetle. It is part of the genus Copelatus and in the subfamily Copelatinae of the family Dytiscidae. It was described by Bilardo & Pederzani in 1953.

References

binaghii
Beetles described in 1953